The Derby City Classic is an annual pool convention and tournament held every January at the Caesars Southern Indiana casino in Elizabeth, Indiana, near Louisville, Kentucky. It is eight days long and offers various disciplines of competition for pool players of all caliber.  It is often referred to as the DCC.

History
The annual convention has been in existence since 1997. Diamond Billiard Products, is the title sponsor of the event, and the lead tournament promoter is Greg Sullivan. Sullivan was inspired to create the DCC by the Johnston City Classic, a former all-around tournament held in Johnston City, Illinois and first organized in 1961 with the purpose of bringing America's top pool gamblers together.

During the eight-day-long convention, competition is held consecutively in three major disciplines, bank pool, nine-ball, and one-pocket. According to Sullivan, "I made it where you're a sucker if you didn't enter." All tournaments are "buyback" competitions in which players can buy their way back in after being first eliminated; matches are races to three sets, much shorter than standard matches; and the entry fee for a tournament is less than that for a spectator's ticket. An All-Around Champion title is awarded each year to an individual player who participates in all three disciplines, and is determined by an ascending point scale and high quality of play, with a prize of $25,000.

The late "St. Louis" Louie Roberts, a legendary American player known for an entertaining style of play and high-stakes gambling , is memorialized by the annual Louie Roberts A&E Award, which stands for "action and entertainment". Attendees of the event vote, and the pool player who displays the most action and entertainment a la Roberts each year wins the award and is thereafter granted lifetime free entry to the Derby City Classic, including a free room at the Horseshoe's hotel during the event. The title was awarded by the DCC from 2003 until 2014, and although it continued in 2015 and 2016 (via fans and not associated with the DCC), it officially stopped being awarded in 2017.

There are also smaller age-restricted competitions for under-16, over-21, over-62, and over-70 divisions, as well as a ladies-only tournament held. Pool industry members bring their wares to the DCC and set up vendor booths, providing a billiard expo for attendees. The vendor booths display a large variety of cue sticks, pool paraphernalia, billiard clothing, books, and instructional DVDs.

To commemorate the great one-pocket champions, OnePocket.org, a website dedicated to the discipline, hosts an annual dinner gala at the Derby City Classic and inducts two people each year into the One Pocket Hall of Fame.

A  formerly run by the late Grady Mathews is another attraction, a ten-ball contest which consists of six players who post an entry fee of $3,000, winner take all. This is recorded live and broadcast via the Internet.

Added to the event in recent years is a straight pool competition. The competition begins where players are given an assigned number of chances to make a high run. The players with the 8 highest runs will qualify into a single elimination tournament where every match is race-to-125 points. As of 2020 the straight pool competition has been cancelled due to schedule interference with other events and competitions.

Winners
Players who participate in the nine-ball, bank pool, and one pocket competitions get the chance to win the overall title called "Master of the Table." It is also possible for a player to win the overall title without winning any of the three competitions. The bigfoot ten-ball event, played on a 10ft table, is also played alongside the other events, although does not count towards the "Master of the Table" title.

Records
 Efren Reyes holds the record for winning the Derby City Classic the most times: 8 titles, with 5 "Master of the Table" titles.
 Efren Reyes holds the record for the most consecutive wins: four. (2004, 2005, 2006, 2007).
 Fedor Gorst and Alex Pagulayan are the only players to win all three events: Nine-ball, Bank pool, One pocket.
 The oldest pool player to ever win the tournament to date is Efren Reyes of Philippines, at 59 years old at the time of his victory, The youngest is Billy Thorpe of United States, aged 20 years old at the time of his victory.

References

 
Pool competitions
Sports competitions in Indiana
Harrison County, Indiana
Annual sporting events in the United States

ja:USオープン (ビリヤード)